Murviel-lès-Montpellier (literally Murviel near Montpellier; Languedocien: Mervièlh) is a commune in the Hérault department in the Occitanie region in southern France.

The Oppidum d'Altimurium, also known as the Oppidum Murviel-les-Montpellier, is an ancient hill-town (or oppidum) located near the village.

Agénor Azéma de Montgravier, pioneering archaeologist, carried out excavations in the mid 19th century at the Roman ruins of Murviel-lès-Montpellier on behalf of the Commission de la Carte des Gaules. An archaeological museum with some artifacts from the site is located in Murviel-les-Montpellier.

Population

See also
Communes of the Hérault department

References

Communes of Hérault